Henry Cookson (born 1975) is a British polar explorer and adventurer.

Henry Cookson may also refer to:
 Henry Wilkinson Cookson (1810–1876), British clergyman and academic
 Harry Cookson (James Henry Cookson, 1869–1922), British footballer
 Henry Anstey Cookson (1886–1949), British pathologist and bacteriologist